Daviesia scabrella is a species of flowering plant in the family Fabaceae and is endemic to inland areas of Western Australia. It is a dense, low-lying, spreading shrub with many tangled branches, scattered, sharply-pointed phyllodes, and yellow and red flowers.

Description

Taxonomy
Daviesia scabrella was first formally described in 2017 by Michael Crisp in the journal Phytotaxa from specimens he collected near Condingup in 2012. The specific epithet (scabrella) means "covered with minute hard points", referring to the texture of the vegetative parts of the plant.

Distribution and habitat

Conservation status 
Daviesia scabrella is listed as "not threatened" by the Government of Western Australia Department of Biodiversity, Conservation and Attractions.

References 

scabrella
Taxa named by Michael Crisp
Plants described in 2017
Flora of Western Australia